The Swagman Restaurant was a restaurant in Ferntree Gully, Melbourne, Australia, which opened in 1972 and burnt down in 1991. The restaurant was famous in Melbourne for its long-running television commercials, cabaret shows, and smorgasbord.

The Swagman was located on Burwood Highway, Ferntree Gully. It was owned by Bastiaan (Basil) and Ina De Jong. An unusually large establishment, The Swagman eventually had a capacity of 1,200 seats and covered 20,000 square metres, and was noted for attracting buses of tourists from rural and international locations, especially Japan.

Entertainment 
The floor shows, featuring dancers, singers, and other acts, were quite unique in Melbourne at that time. The shows changed every three months. Choreographers included Peggy Rush, Coral Deague, Jan Rogers, and Jodie Greenwood. Greenwood was a dancer and performer at the Swagman for 14 years, and was the choreographer from 1979 until 1991, when the restaurant burnt down. She featured in all the television commercials for the restaurant, which played on late-night commercial television for many years. Performers who played at the venue included Frank Amorosi (father of Vanessa Amorosi), David Gould, Dean Lotherington, Sean Martin Hingston, Debbie Reynolds, Robert Goulet, the Mills Brothers, Dr. Hook, Pilita Corrales, and the Village People. Paul Sheean  at age 16 was the youngest singer to perform full-time in the cabaret floorshow.

Fire 
The Swagman burnt down at around 4:30am on 27 May 1991. The fire was front-page news in Melbourne. The insurance firm Royal Insurance alleged arson and refused to pay the $7 million claim made by the owners of the restaurant, who then sued for the amount. The case was confidentially settled in October 1992. After the settlement, however, the owners were sued by the ANZ Bank, who also alleged arson. The restaurant was not rebuilt after the fire. The owners sold the property, on which the Stylus nightclub was then built. The new owners hired Basil De Jong to manage the nightclub.

See also

List of restaurant in Australia

References

External links
Photo of the Swagman after the fire, September 1992, State Library of Victoria, accessed 23 March 2015
Photo of choreographer Coral Deague.

Restaurants in Melbourne
Defunct restaurants in Australia
Restaurants established in 1972
1991 disestablishments in Australia
1991 fires in Oceania
Buffet restaurants
1972 establishments in Australia
Restaurants disestablished in 1991